Dantakali Temple is a Hindu temple situated in the mountains of Bijayapur in Dharan, Nepal. Dantakali is named for the teeth of the goddess Satidevi. Danta means teeth and Kali is a Hindu goddess.

References

Hindu temples in Koshi Province
Buildings and structures in Sunsari District